Toques is a municipality in the Spanish province of A Coruña in the autonomous community of Galicia in northwestern Spain. It has a population of 1580 (Spanish 2001 Census) and an area of 78 km².

Municipalities in the Province of A Coruña